Psychology of Violence  is a peer-reviewed academic journal published by the American Psychological Association. It was established in 2010 with Sherry Hamby (University of the South) as founding editor-in-chief, and covers research on "identifying the causes of violence from a psychological framework, finding ways to prevent or reduce violence, and developing practical interventions and treatments". The current editor-in-chief is Antonia Abbey (Wayne State University).

Abstracting and indexing 
The journal is abstracted and indexed by the Social Sciences Citation Index and SCOPUS. According to the Journal Citation Reports, the journal has a 2020 impact factor of 4.147.

References

External links 
 

2010 establishments in the United States
Abnormal psychology journals
American Psychological Association academic journals
English-language journals
Publications established in 2010
Quarterly journals
Violence journals